Duet is a 2013 action game by Australian game developer Kumobius for iOS and Android. Players control two coloured orbs, guiding them to avoid incoming obstacles. Its Android version was first released as a part of Humble Mobile Bundle 6.

Gameplay 
The player rotates a circular track with two coloured orbs, guiding the balls to avoid incoming obstacles. The level is reset once an orb crashes into an obstacle. It's required to keep both orbs intact to pass a level. The names of the levels are from the Kübler-Ross model.

Reception 
The game has gathered mixed to positive reviews from critics. As of August 2014, Metacritic lists a score of 79 for the game, a rating of "Generally favorable reviews". Duet is also listed a score of 80.00% on GameRankings. Critics praise Duet for its controls and design, yet noting its notorious difficulty. It is rated 4.9/5 on Apple's App Store, and 4.7/5 on Google's Play Store. Duet is also rated 9/10 on Steam. It was featured in The New Yorker's Best, Most Elegant iPhone Games of the Year 2013 and in Kotaku's Mobile Game of the Year 2013.

References

Further reading 

 https://www.cnet.com/news/duet-how-a-kick-butt-game-soundtrack-is-made/

External links 
 

2013 video games
IOS games
Android (operating system) games
Linux games
MacOS games
Video games developed in Australia
Windows games